Diógenes Lara (6 April 1903 – 16 September 1968) was a Bolivian footballer who played as a midfielder. He was also a lieutenant in the Bolivian army.

Career 
He made two appearances for the Bolivia national team at the 1930 FIFA World Cup in the team, "New Players", winning a medal during the first Soccer World Cup in history. From 1945 to 1946, he then managed the national team.

References

External links

1903 births
1968 deaths
Footballers from La Paz
Bolivian footballers
Bolivia international footballers
1930 FIFA World Cup players
Club Bolívar players
Association football midfielders
Bolivian football managers
Bolivia national football team managers